The Department is a 1974 play by David Williamson about political intrigue at a university department. It was based on Williamson's time as a lecturer at Swinburne Tech.

Williamson wrote it for the South Australian Theatre Company. It premiered in 1974 at the opening of a new playhouse, then transferred to Melbourne and Sydney.

TV Adaptation

The play was adapted into a TV movie in 1980 which was produced by Noel Ferrier as part of the Australian Theatre Festival.

Cast
Peter Sumner as Robby
Richard Moir as Peter
Grant Dodwell as John
Barbara Stephens
John Ewart

Reception
The Canberra Times called it "a poorly constructed exercise".

The Age called it "a success... some remarkable goods." Another reviewer from that paper called it "an excellent production".

The Sydney Morning Herald critic said "it's a long time since I've seen a better sustained performance in a locally produced TV play."

Jack Hibberd, whose play A Toast of Melba was also filmed as part of the Festival, called it 'dreary, mundane. Awesomely so. I'm not impressed by that 'slice of life' realism style. It's just theatrical journalism."

References

External links

The Department (1980 TV adaptation) at Screen Australia

Plays by David Williamson
1974 plays
Australian plays adapted into films
Films based on works by David Williamson
1980s English-language films